The Malta Film Commission (Maltese: Il-Kummisjoni tal-Films) is a quasi-governmental, non-profit, public organization based in Malta. Their primary purpose is to attract film productions to come to Malta for the benefit of the Maltese Economy. Its offices are located at the Malta Film Studios in Kalkara. The first proposal for a film commission was lobbied by Malcolm Scerri-Ferrante in 1997. The commission was then created as a film liaison office in 1999. Over the 22 years it has been operating, numerous financing incentives have been presented in 2005, 2008 and in 2014. The current film commissioner is Johann Grech. The implementation of new strategy has led to a large growth in the industry, with over 50 productions filmed in Malta resulting in more than €200 million being injected into Malta's economy via these incentives. The Film Commission also provides support for smaller film services within the country. Recently, the commission have organized the first edition of the Malta Film Awards. They were held on the 29th January 2022.

References 

Film commissions
Film production
Kalkara
Cinema of Malta